Tanisha Tamara Drummond Johnson (born August 3, 1976 in Ciudad de Colón, Panamá) is a Panamanian model and beauty pageant contestant winner of the Señorita Panamá 1997. Also represented Panama in Miss Universe 1998, the 47th Miss Universe pageant was held at Stan Sheriff Arena, Honolulu, Hawaii, United States on May 12, 1998.

She represented Colón.

Miss Caraïbes Hibiscus
The same year Drummond competed for Panamá in the Miss Caraïbes Hibiscus 1998 and won the title. This was the first title for Panamá in this pageant.

External links
  Señorita Panamá official website
  Miss Panama.net

Living people
Miss Universe 1998 contestants
Panamanian beauty pageant winners
Señorita Panamá
1976 births